Modesto Junior College (MJC) is a public community college in Modesto, California. It is part of Yosemite Community College District along with Columbia College. MJC, and Columbia College, belong to the California Community College system along with 112 other public community colleges. The college has two campuses in Modesto. The East Campus is the original campus while the West Campus is the larger of the two. Courses are provided in general education, lower-division transfer programs, occupational and developmental education.

MJC is accredited by the Accrediting Commission for Community and Junior Colleges (ACCJC).

History 
Modesto Junior College can trace its roots to the decision by the California State Legislature in 1907 to authorize high schools to create junior colleges what were termed "postgraduate courses of study" similar to the courses offered in just the first two years of university studies.

Shortly after the decision by the legislature, Fresno City College was formed 96 miles south of Modesto. Due to the success of Fresno City College, the state legislature passed legislation in 1921 allowing for the creation of community college districts. Modesto Junior College, founded in September 1921, became the first community college district.

Modesto Junior College started out with only 61 students but has since expanded to over 19,000 students. In addition to enrollment increases, the school has expanded to having two campuses MJC West and MJC East along with more than 20 community sites throughout the Yosemite College District that are used to meet particular education needs.

In 2015, it was announced that Modesto Junior College would become one of the first community colleges in California to offer Bachelor of Science degrees. The college will offer a Bachelor of Science degree in respiratory care starting in 2017.

Campus 
There are two Modesto Junior College campuses; MJC East and MJC West. MJC East is 58.3 arces and MJC West is 167.1 acres – between both campuses, there are 6 large scale agricultural units, 7 (agriculture student) housing units, 74 buildings, 370 rooms including 15 athletic areas, 104 classrooms, 36 common use areas, 21 computer labs, 12 conference rooms, 99 lab classrooms, 16 lectures halls and 10 performance rooms.

Administration 
The college is part of the Yosemite Community College District within the California Community Colleges System. The current college president is Dr. Santanu Bandyopadhyay. The district is governed by an elected seven-member Board of Trustees.

Academics 
Modesto Junior College offers Associate Degrees. The school boasts 19,262 students and is accredited by the Western Association of Schools and Colleges.

Modesto Junior College provides over 88 Associate Degrees, 30 of which are of Agriculture alone. MJC is also home to an agricultural internship program in which students are given residence on West Campus. The school owns over 100 acres of various crops which it uses to teach the students theory of crop and animal sciences as well as give the students in the field experience.

Athletics

Modesto Junior College is a member of CCCAA. Sports teams are nicknamed the MJC Pirates and their colors are blue and white. MJC has the largest community college sports program in Northern California with 21 sports: Men's and Women's basketball; Men's and Women's Cross Country; Men's Football; Men's and Women's Golf; Men's and Women's Soccer; Women's Softball; Men's and Women's Swimming; Men's and Women's Tennis; Men's and Women's Track; Women's Volleyball; Men's and Women's Water Polo; and Men's Wrestling at the Intercollegiate level respectively.

Notable people 

Oscar Zeta Acosta, Chicano activist, lawyer, and author
Matt Bettencourt, PGA Tour golfer
Shawn Boskie, Major League Baseball pitcher for the Chicago Cubs
Robert O. Briggs, marching band director
Gary Condit, served in the House of Representatives from 1989 to 2003
Hiram Fuller, professional basketball player
Steve Gonzalez, American football player
John Soares, film director, actor, editor, and fight choreographer; directed Sockbaby
Dot-Marie Jones, track and field Olympian (competed as Dot Jones) and actress
Ray Lankford, professional baseball player for the St. Louis Cardinals and San Diego Padres
George Lucas, film director, screenwriter; directed Star Wars and American Graffiti.
Keith Luuloa, professional baseball player
Gino Marchetti, professional football player; defensive end for Baltimore Colts, NFL Hall of Famer
Jeff Moorad, former sports agent, owner of the San Diego Padres baseball team
Roger Nixon, composer
Ronald "Ron" Oliveira, American businessman and current CEO of Revolut USA 
Alex Olmedo, professional tennis player, Wimbledon champion (1959)
Lindsay Pearce, actress
Brandon Pettit, convicted or murdering his parents, was enrolled in the Fire Training Academy at Modesto Junior College.
Jeremy Renner, actor
Justin Roiland, actor, animator, writer, producer, and director; co-creator of Rick and Morty
Erick Threets, professional baseball player (San Francisco Giants)
Paul Wiggin, professional football player (Cleveland Browns) and coach (Stanford Cardinal and Kansas City Chiefs)
Cy Young 1952 Olympic gold medal, javelin

References

External links

 
California Community Colleges
Universities and colleges in Stanislaus County, California
Buildings and structures in Modesto, California
Education in Modesto, California
Schools accredited by the Western Association of Schools and Colleges
Educational institutions established in 1921
1921 establishments in California